The Mawddach Trail is a cycle path route, part of Lôn Las Cymru, which runs for some  from Dolgellau  to Morfa Mawddach railway station , by Barmouth bridge on the Cambrian coast. It is maintained by the Snowdonia National Park and is popular with walkers and cyclists alike. It passes some estuarine areas that are important for water birds, and the RSPB Information Centre at Penmaenpool makes use of the old signal box as an observation centre overlooking the estuary.

The cycle route is a rail trail running along the former trackbed of the Ruabon to Barmouth branch line of the Great Western Railway. This line closed under the Beeching Axe in the 1960s.

External links
Gwynedd Council - Recreational Routes - Mawddach Trail
The Mawddach Trail - "The Railway Walk"
The Mawddach Way - A circular footpath walk around the Mawddach Estuary
www.geograph.co.uk : photos of the Mawddach Trail and surrounding area

Cycleways in Wales
Transport in Gwynedd
Rail trails in Wales